Fit In may refer to:
"Fit In", a song on Kim Wilde's 1984 Teases & Dares
"Fit In", a song on Lil Baby's 2018 Harder Than Ever
"Fit In", a song by Anthony Crawford (musician)